Alberto dos Santos Franco the Admiral Franco (Rio de Janeiro, December 5, 1913 - São Paulo, May 4, 2011) was an officer of the Navy of Brazil. In his career, reached the rank of rear admiral

Biography 
He was the son of Luiz de Araujo Franco and Adelina Santos Franco.

He attended high school in the traditional school Pedro II in Rio de Janeiro and became a navy officer in the Naval Academy in 1933. Participated in the war efforts of the Navy of Brazil during World War II. Later he specialized in studies related to the phenomena of the tides. He was promoted to rear admiral in 1961, he won several medals and was awarded the title of Professor Emeritus of the Oceanographic Institute of the University of São Paulo in 1996, where he was director in the period 1970–1974. Developed computational methods based on techniques of Fast Fourier Transform for analysis and prediction of tides. In 1976 he earned a doctorate in Naval Engineering from Polytechnic School of the University of São Paulo defending thesis entitled "Components in Harmonic Tide Small Funds". These components are generated by tidal currents, where the periodic movements (amplitude and phase) of Sun and Moon in "around the Earth" are combined in a nonlinear way leading to other components called small fund. It is now generated by the transformation of the tide in ocean barotropic baroclinic tides in the shallow regions of offshore.

Participation in Hydrographic Cruises for building charts 
(Ministry of the Navy - 1937 to 1955)
 Letters - Areas
  802 - Port Natal
  803 - Canal de Sao Roque
 1103 - Bay of Aratu and vicinity (campaign manager)
 1400 - From Rio Doce to Cabo de Sao Tome
 1500 - Cape of São Tomé to Rio de Janeiro
 1504 - Bay of Búzios
 1505 - Cape Buzios Cabo Frio
 1700 - The Island of San Sebastian on the island of Bom Abrigo
 1701 - Port of Santos
 1800 - From Ilha de Bom Abrigo to Ilha do grove
 1804 - Port of South San Francisco
 1805 - Fairway to Joinville
 1809 - Bay of Itapocoroia (campaign manager)
 1810 - Bay of Porto Belo
 1900 - From the Island Grove Towers (campaign manager)
 1905 - Port of Florianópolis (campaign manager)

Scientific Papers 
 Comparative precision of prismatic astrolabes. International  Hydrographic Review XXVIII(1),   1951.
 Modification of the mean projection plane  of  the  Multiplex  apparatus.  International  Hydrographic Review, XXIX( ), 1952.  Work awarded by the Brazilian Navy.
 Shallow-water  tides.  International  Hydrographic  Review,  XXXIII(1), 1956.
 Brazilian Navy Instruction on  Tides.  International  Hydrographic Review, XL(1), 1963.
 Harmonic Analysis of  the  tide  by   the   semi-graphic   method.  International  Hydrographic  Review,  XL(2), 1963.
 Adjustment of  aerial  triangulation.  International  Hydrographic Review, XLI(1), 1964.
 Harmonic analysis of tides for seven days of hourly observations. International  Hydrographic  Review, XLI(2), 1964.
 Harmonic analysis of tides through linear combinations of ordinates. International Hydrographic Review, XLII(1), 1965.
  Relative  accuracy  of  some  methods  of   harmonic   analysis   of   tides.  International  Hydrographic Review. XLII(2), 1965.
 Semi-graphic method of analysis for seven days' tidal observations. International Hydrographic Review, XLIII(1),1966.
 Datum for  sounding  reduction.  International  Hydrographic Review, XLIII(2), 1966.
 The Munk-Cartwright method for prediction and analysis of tides. International Hydrographic  Review, XLV(1), 1968.
 Generalization of  y-parallax   differential   formula.   Photogrammetria  Elsevier  Publishing  Company, Amsterdam, 23,(1968) 95–102.
 Fundamentals  of  spectral  analysis  of  discrete   observations.   International   Hydrographic   Review. XLVII(1), 1970.
 The Fast Fourier Transform and its application to tidal oscillations. Boletim do Instituto Oceanográfico da Universidade de São Paulo, 20(1). 1971. (in collaboration with N.J. Rock).
 A hybrid algorithm for the rapid Fourier  transform  of  extensive series of data.  Boletim  do Instituto Oceanográfico da Universidade de São Paulo, 20(2), 1971. (in collaboration with N.J. Rock).
 Comparative accuracy of  Fourier   tidal   analysis   employing  different  time  spans  with  reference to Doodson analysis. The  2nd International Ocean Development Conference, Toquio, 1972  (preprint). (in collaboration with N.J. Rock).
 Improved harmonic analysis. Revista Ciência e Cultura, 25(2).1973.  (in collaboration with N.J. Rock).
 A refined method of tidal analysis. The Belle W. Baruch  Library  in  Marine  Science, 7.  Syposium  on  Estuarine  Transport  Process held in Georgetown, South Carolina, 1976. Edited  by Böjrn Kjerfve. University of South Carolina press.
 On the Karunaratne's method of checking hourly heights.  International Hydrographic Review, LIX(1), 1982.
 Improved technique of short period analysis. Canadian  Hydrographic  Service  Centennial   Conference. Ottawa, 1983. (in collaboration with J. Harari).
 Tidal prediction with a small  personal  computer.  International Hydrographic Review, LXII(2).
 On the stability of long series  tidal  analysis.  1993(in collaboration with J. Harari).  International Hydrographic Review, Monaco, LXX(1), march.
 Rapid tidal analysis, from 3  julian years span up to a nodal cycle span, with a PC. 1995.  International Hydrographic Review, Monaco, LXXII(1), Monaco, march.

References

External links
Biography in the site of the Brazilian Navy 
Tides and Oceanic Temporal Processes
USP Oceanography-Culture and Extension

1913 births
2011 deaths
Brazilian admirals
People from Rio de Janeiro (city)